Peter D. Horbury (born 27 January 1950) is a British car designer who is Executive Vice President, Design of Geely Auto. He is widely known for his design work for Volvo and has worked in a variety of roles in the automotive industry, including as Executive Design Director, Americas for Ford between 2004 and 2009. He was named UK magazine Autocar's Designer of the Year in 1998 and during his 40+ year career has been actively involved in the design of more than 50 cars as well as trucks, buses, and motorcycles.

Background
Born in 1950 in Alnwick, England, Horbury attended King Edward VII School in Sheffield and was coincidentally in the same school year as another prominent British car designer, Ford of Europe's current Executive Director of Design Martin Smith. Horbury went on to study at the Newcastle upon Tyne College of Art, graduating in 1972 with a degree in Industrial Design. Like Smith, he later attended the Royal College of Art in London graduating with a master's degree in automotive design in 1974.

Career

Early career

Horbury started his career at Chrysler UK and then spent some time at Volvo in the Netherlands, working on the 480ES coupe. He has remarked in the past that the Volvo grill under the bumper of the 480ES was a last minute addition prior to release, when senior Volvo management realised that the car would not have the classic Volvo grille and slanting highlight. Immediately prior to his longer second 'remarkable' stint at Volvo, Horbury had worked in the United Kingdom for MGA Developments Ltd. In addition he worked on some key Ford product programs in Europe, such as the Sierra, Escort and Granada.

Volvo Cars

Horbury is widely known for leading the revival of the Volvo brand during his eleven years from 1991 as Design Director. Arriving after the 1992 Volvo 850 had been styled, Horbury made an impact with the 1992 Volvo ECC Concept that would influence Volvo design for years to come. He was instrumental in moving the company beyond their traditional boxy look with a new design language for the brand. This new look was characterised by distinctive shoulder lines that ran the length of the car, more curved surfaces, rounded noses, and softer, less utilitarian interiors. He contributed to many designs including the Mitsubishi Carisma related 1995 S40 and V40, the sporty 1997 Volvo C70, which was engineered in collaboration with TWR, closely followed by the 1998 S80. He also contributed to the remaining line up with the 2000 V70 station wagon, the 2001 S60, the 2003 XC90 SUV, and the 2004 S40 and V50. He also oversaw the 1998 facelift of the Volvo 850 series which transformed them into the Volvo S70 and V70 series. During this stint he also worked on the 2006 C70, 2006 V70, 2006 S80, with the last Horbury Volvo of this era being the 2006 C30. Ex-Mercedes-Benz designer Steve Mattin assumed the responsibility of Design Director of Volvo in 2005.

Ford
In 2002, Horbury was made head of all of Ford's Premier Automotive Group design studios which included Jaguar, Land Rover, Aston Martin, and Volvo. With talented designers in charge of each of those brands' design, Horbury had little to do and in January 2004 was promoted to Ford of America as Executive Design Director of all Ford's American brands, reporting to Ford's group vice president of Design, J Mays. Mays explained the decision:

"We tapped Peter to lead our North American design team for two key reasons: First, he brings to this team nearly three decades of experience as a strong designer and an even better leader. Second, North America remains our most profitable market, and that’s where we need to invest our top design talent. We are more heavily investing in refining the design DNA for this market’s products. So, naturally, I want this team to have even more power to get the job done."

Horbury ran a staff of 800 including Patrick Schiavone and Moray Callum and was given the task of renewing the design language of all of Ford America's brands in the wake of sliding sales. He was responsible for the implementation of Ford's 'Red, White and Bold' design strategy that aimed to make American Fords more distinctively American in their aesthetic. This is especially the case with the forthright 'Hi I'm Dave' three bar chrome grilles as illustrated by the 2006 Ford Fusion, 2008 Ford Focus, 2008 Ford Taurus, 2008 Ford Taurus X, 2010 Ford Taurus, and 2010 Ford Fusion – all vehicles designed/facelifted under his supervision. He also oversaw the introduction of a similarly bold frontal treatment to Lincoln as previewed by the 2007 Lincoln MKR concept revealed at the 2007 North American International Auto Show in Detroit, followed by the 2009 Lincoln MKS, 2010 Lincoln MKT, facelifted 2010 Lincoln MKZ, and facelifted 2011 Lincoln MKX. The thinking was to infuse Ford's American brands with a distinctive style in an attempt to make them more appealing to American buyers who are demanding riskier designs that are recognisable from distance.

Return to Volvo Cars
In May 2009, Horbury returned to Volvo as vice president, Design replacing Steve Mattin who left the company at the end of March 2009. The first public sight of his work from his third stint at Volvo, and the first for Volvo's new owners Geely was the Volvo Concept Universe shown at the 2011 Shanghai Motor Show.

Geely Auto

In late 2011, Horbury was appointed Senior Vice President of Design for Geely with the responsibility of overseeing the design of all Geely brands and establishing a network of Geely design studios around the world. In this role he supervises the design work of Geely's brands, including Geely, Lynk & Co, Proton, and Lotus.

References

People from Alnwick
Ford designers
People educated at King Edward VII School, Sheffield
British automobile designers
Living people
Alumni of the Royal College of Art
1950 births
Volvo Cars
Geely people
Volvo people